Shinjuku Toho Building (Japanese: 新宿東宝ビル) is a building in Kabukichō, Shinjuku, Tokyo, Japan.

See also
 Godzilla head
 Godzilla Street

External links
 

Buildings and structures in Shinjuku